Daniel 'Dani' Sánchez Andrades (born 10 November 1984) is a Spanish professional footballer who plays as a forward or midfielder.

Club career
Born in Málaga, Andalusia, Sánchez played youth football with hometown's Málaga CF, but never appeared as a senior for the club, eventually leaving in 2003. He went on to appear for several lower league teams over the following six seasons, never competing in higher than Segunda División B where he appeared for Real Murcia Imperial; he also represented CD Alhaurino, CD Baza and Real Betis B.

Sánchez signed for Inverness Caledonian Thistle in Scotland on 1 August 2009, following a trial period. He made his debut the same day, in a 4–0 home win against Annan Athletic for the season's Scottish League Cup.

Sánchez was released by Inverness in June 2011. The following month he began a trial with A-League club Wellington Phoenix FC, appearing in pre-season against Miramar Rangers AFC just two hours after getting off the plane. On 5 September, it was announced that he had signed a one-year contract.

On 9 June 2013, Sánchez was released alongside four other players. Subsequently, he took his game to the Hong Kong First Division League and the Thai Division 1 League.

On 29 January 2015, Sánchez signed with the Fort Lauderdale Strikers of the North American Soccer League. In April of the following year he switched clubs and countries again, joining FC Jazz in the Finnish Ykkönen.

References

External links

1984 births
Living people
Footballers from Málaga
Spanish footballers
Association football midfielders
Association football forwards
Segunda División B players
Tercera División players
Málaga CF players
Betis Deportivo Balompié footballers
Real Murcia Imperial players
Scottish Premier League players
Scottish Football League players
Inverness Caledonian Thistle F.C. players
A-League Men players
Wellington Phoenix FC players
Hong Kong First Division League players
Tuen Mun SA players
Dani Sanchez
Dani Sanchez
North American Soccer League players
Fort Lauderdale Strikers players
Ykkönen players
FC Jazz players
Spanish expatriate footballers
Expatriate footballers in Scotland
Expatriate association footballers in New Zealand
Expatriate footballers in Hong Kong
Expatriate footballers in Thailand
Expatriate soccer players in the United States
Expatriate footballers in Finland
Spanish expatriate sportspeople in the United States